Pamela Sykes is an Australian medical scientist and Chair of the Institutional Biosafety Committee at the Flinders Centre for Innovation in Cancer at Flinders University. She is a Strategic Professor in the area of Preventive Cancer Biology and leads a research group which studies the biological effects of low-dose radiation. She is a member of the Radiation Protection Committee which advises the Government of South Australia. Her research has been published in Radiation Research, Epigenetics, Transgenic Research, Cell Biology and Toxicology, PLOS ONE, Mutation Research and the Journal of Clinical Pathology. She is an Associate Editor for the journal Radiation Research. Sykes' research into the effects of low-dose ionising radiation has been funded by the United States Department of Energy's Low Dose Radiation Research Program since the early 2000s.

As of 2016, Sykes is a member of the UCL Australia Nuclear Working Group.

References 

Living people
Australian women scientists
Australian medical researchers
Academic staff of Flinders University
Year of birth missing (living people)